The women's K-1 500 metres event was an individual kayaking event conducted as part of the Canoeing at the 1972 Summer Olympics program.

Medalists

Results

Heats
The 15 competitors first raced in two heats on September 5. The top three finishers from each of the heats advanced directly to the semifinals while the rest competed in the repechages two days later.

Repechages
Taking place on September 7, the top three finishers from each repechage advanced to the semifinals.

Semifinal
The top three finishers in of the three semifinal (raced on September 8) advanced to the final.

Final
The final was held on September 9.

References
1972 Summer Olympics official report Volume 3. p. 495. 
Sports-reference.com 1972 women's K-1 500 m results.

Women's K-1 500
Olympic
Women's events at the 1972 Summer Olympics